Dalmahoy (Scottish Gaelic: Dail MoThua) is a hotel and former country house near Edinburgh, Scotland. The house is protected as a category A listed building,

History
The estate was the property of the Dalmahoys until the early 18th century. James VI of Scotland stayed at the old castle in April 1589 while hunting. James VI hunted at Dalmahoy with his brother-in-law, the Duke of Holstein on 18 March 1598.

The present house was built in 1725 for George Dalrymple, a younger son of the Earl of Stair, and was designed by the architect William Adam (1689–1748). Dalmahoy was sold in 1750 to James Douglas, 14th Earl of Morton. 

In 1787 an extension and a number of alteration were made to designs by Alexander Laing. Further alterations were made in the 1830s, involving William Burn, and in 1851 by Brown and Wardrop. In 1927 the house was leased and converted to a hotel, with golf courses being established in the grounds. 

Circa 1927 a dedicated station was opened on the Shotts line to serve Dalmahoy's new golf course. Ravelrig Platform for Dalmahoy Golf Course is recorded as having closed by 1930.

The present hotel was built in 1990, and comprises substantial extensions to the original building and the golf course/hotel complex played host to the second ever (and first in Europe) Solheim Cup in 1992. Dalmahoy is now an independent hotel.

References

Houses in Edinburgh
Listed hotels in Scotland
Hotels in Edinburgh
Category A listed buildings in Edinburgh
Houses completed in 1725
William Adam buildings
Solheim Cup venues
Golf clubs and courses in Edinburgh
1725 establishments in Great Britain